The 1990 Ugandan Super League was the 23rd season of the official Ugandan football championship, the top-level football league of Uganda.

Overview
The 1990 Uganda Super League was contested by 11 teams and was won by SC Villa, while BN United, Nile Breweries and Resistance were relegated.

League standings

Leading goalscorer
The top goalscorer in the 1990 season was Majid Musisi of SC Villa with 28 goals.

References

External links
 Uganda - List of Champions - RSSSF (Hans Schöggl)
 Ugandan Football League Tables - League321.com

Ugandan Super League seasons
1
Uganda
Uganda